The hidden pebblesnail, scientific name Somatogyrus decipiens, is a species of minute freshwater snails with an operculum, aquatic gastropod molluscs or micromolluscs in the family Hydrobiidae.

This species is endemic to Alabama in the United States.  Its natural habitat is rivers. The common name is based on a river called the Hidden River.

References

Molluscs of the United States
Somatogyrus
Gastropods described in 1909
Taxonomy articles created by Polbot